Mohamed Amine Khemisa better known as Sneazzy or Sneazzy West or Sneaz (born 12 January 1992) is a French rapper and actor. Besides his own solo output, he is also a member of the French rap collective 1995.

Sneazzy was born in a mixed Moroccan and Tunisian family and grew up with his mother in the 15th arrondissement of Paris. In 2008, he co-founded the hip hop collective 1995 alongside Nekfeu and a number of other artists like Alpha Wann, Darryl Zeuja, Areno Jaz, Fonky Flav' and DJ Lo'. Their collective EP La Sourcein 2011 was followed by the EP La suite in 2012 and the album Paris Sud Minute beginning of 2013.

In 2015, Sneazzy released his debut solo album Super with limited success. In 2016 and 2017 he released Dieu bénisse Supersound in three separate volumes as a trilogy. In 2019, he took an acting role in the film Source (English title Wipe Out) released on 27 July 2019. His second album Nouvo Mode was released on 6 March 2020.

The track "Zéro Détail" featuring Nekfeu created huge controversy with lyrics targeting journalist and presenter of C News Pascal Praud of being an amateur and for discrediting Islam. Praud also accused him of uttering menacing lyrics compromising his safety. Sneazzy claimed he had been misunderstood and absolved Nekfeu of any personal responsibility in the affair saying he himself was the "sole author" explaining that expressions like "balle dans le cervelet [la tête]" and "canon dans la bouche" were metaphores and commonly used and were not meant literally. Praud eventually withdrew his plans of suing Sneazzy over the affair.

Discography

Albums

Singles

Featured in

Other songs

*Did not appear in the official Belgian Ultratop 50 charts, but rather in the bubbling under Ultratip charts.

Filmography
2019: La Source (English title Wipe Out) as Samir Benhima

References

Rappers from Paris
French actors
Living people
French people of Moroccan descent
French people of Tunisian descent
1992 births